Jerome Fogel (January 17, 1936  October 21, 2019) was an American actor.

He is best remembered for portraying Jerome "Jerry" Buell on a television situation comedy, The Mothers-in-Law, from 1967 to 1969.

Partial filmography

References

External links 

 

1936 births
2019 deaths
Male actors from Rochester, New York
American male film actors
American male television actors
American television actors
20th-century American male actors